is a passenger railway station  located in the city of   Amagasaki Hyōgo Prefecture, Japan. It is operated by the private transportation company Hanshin Electric Railway.

Lines

Layout
The station consists of two opposed elevated side platforms serving two tracks. The ticket gate and concourse are on the 2nd floor, and the platforms are on the 3rd floor.

Platforms

Adjacent stations

|-
!colspan=5|Hanshin Electric Railway

History 
Kuise Station was opened on April 12, 1905 with the opening of the Hanshin Main Line

Passenger statistics
In fiscal 2019, the station was used by an average of 9,189 passengers daily

Surrounding area
"Eki no Machi Kuise" shopping center
Kuise Kumano Shrine
Japan National Route 2

See also
List of railway stations in Japan

References

External links

 Kuise Station website 

Railway stations in Japan opened in 1905
Railway stations in Hyōgo Prefecture
Hanshin Main Line
Amagasaki